Simon Harris (born 28 November 1962) is a DJ, producer, remixer and pioneering electronic musician predominantly known for his record 'Bass (How Low Can You Go?), as the founder of the hip hop record labels 'WORKROOM' and Music of Life and producer of most of its catalogue of songs.

Originally from London, Harris is a producer of sample-based breakbeat and house music. As a remixer, music label owner, and producer, Harris has worked with Pete Tong, Simon Cowell, James Brown, Prince, The Stone Roses, Joyce Sims, Fatboy Slim, Paul Oakenfold, Tony! Toni! Toné!, War, Arthur Baker, Boyz II Men, Heatwave, as well as Steve "Silk" Hurley.

Originally a DJ, Harris started selling professional audio equipment in London's Tottenham Court Road, then became a club promoter. In 1983, Harris was invited to become one of the original remixers for Tony Prince's DMC (now the world's largest DJ association). Harris then joined forces with the late BBC Radio 1 DJ Froggy (1949–2008) and produced remixes for major labels including Polydor (James Brown, Roy Ayers), Chrysalis (Doug E. Fresh), A&M (Jeffrey Osborne), EMI, BMG, Columbia, Island, London and eventually PRT for The Real Thing's "You to Me Are Everything" remix (UK number three pop hit). In 1986, Harris and Froggy started their own independent label 'Music of Life'. The label was initially distributed by Morgan Khan's 'Streetwave' group and the first releases were from Cerrone ("Supernature") and La Toya Jackson.

Within a short time, Froggy left to pursue other projects and Music of Life became one of the UK's first rap/hip-hop labels, initially licensing US products, and then with Harris producing many British rap artists including Derek B (the label's A&R executive), followed by Daddy Freddy, MC Duke, Tenor Fly, Hijack, Demon Boyz (Million Dan), and Einstein. Sister label 'Living Beat' releases include Samantha Fox (A Song for Europe), Dina Carroll, Jocelyn Brown and Joyce Sims. Also, via Germany's Edel Group, Harris remixed "The Most Beautiful Girl in the World" by Prince.

Harris has produced many breakbeat albums designed for DJs and producers, including Beats, Breaks and Scratches in 12 volumes. Other artists who produced similar albums for Music of Life include Paul Oakenfold, George Clinton and Norman Cook.

Harris continued to remix and produce for many artists. Simon Cowell commissioned him to remix Sinitta's "Window Shopping" for his Fanfare label, and shortly thereafter, Pete Tong (BBC Radio 1) signed Harris as an artist to his Polygram FFRR label. The first release was a rap version of Michael Jackson's "Bad" ("Bad on the Mike"). This was followed by "Bass (How Low Can You Go?)", which achieved U.S. Billboard Dance number one status. FFRR released Harris's Bass album next followed by more singles including Marshall Jefferson's "(I've Got Your) Pleasure Control" (with Lonnie Gordon) and "Here Comes That Sound". Harris also remixed I Am the Resurrection for The Stone Roses.

Summary 
 Producer and performer of Billboard number one hit "Bass (How Low Can You Go?)".
 Founder of British hip hop label Music of Life with hundreds of productions involving new British, US and Jamaican rap and reggae artists, released in over 70 countries. Music of Life was founded in 1986 with vinyl single and album releases followed by CD releases.
 Remixer for many artists and music companies and commissioned by Simon Cowell for Sinitta remix, projects with Norman Cook (Fatboy Slim), Arthur Baker, War, James Brown, George Clinton, the first Elvis Presley dance mix ("Bossa Nova Baby" on RCA), Tony! Toni! Toné! and for Prince's "The Most Beautiful Girl in the World".
 Produced fusion of reggae and hip hop with Asher D and Daddy Freddy, "Ragamuffin Hip Hop" in 1987 with the initial release on US label Profile (Run DMC) followed by Chrysalis.
 Guest speaker and judge at dance music seminars and conventions including DMC world DJ championships.
 Producer of Beats Breaks and Scratches series of albums – breakbeat and sample album series.
 DJ/demonstrator of JBL speaker systems at London's APRS (association of professional recording studios).
 Work featured by the BBC and other British broadcasters.

Recent career
Harris has sustained a 30+-year production career. His work is varied and has included music video (Daddy Freddy, Joyce Sims), radio and TV commercial production (KISS-FM, CD WOW!, Coca-Cola) and several TV documentaries including Run-D.M.C. (Kings of Rap, broadcast on MTV in the US) and REM!X (featuring Frankie Knuckles, David Morales, Jason Nevins, Arthur Baker, Norman Cook, Paul Oakenfold and more).

Discography

Singles

References

External links
 Simon Harris website
 Simon Harris at Discogs
 Simon Harris new blog site 2010

1962 births
Living people
English DJs
English record producers
English electronic musicians
British hip hop record producers
Breakbeat musicians
Musicians from London
Remixers
DJs from London
Electronic dance music DJs
FFRR Records artists